Man Bait may refer to:

 The Last Page, a 1952 British film noir, released in the United States as Man Bait
 Man Bait (1926 film), an American silent comedy film